Csap or CSAP may refer to:

 Csap, Hungarian name for Chop, Ukraine
 CSaP, Centre for Science and Policy at the University of Cambridge
 CSAP or Colorado Student Assessment Program
 CSAP or Conseil Scolaire Acadien Provincial, the school board in Nova Scotia